Nicolaas Pieneman (1 January 1809 – 30 December 1860) was a Dutch painter, art collector, lithographer, and sculptor.

Biography 
Nicolaas Pieneman was born on 1 January 1809 in Amersfoort in the Kingdom of Holland. He was the son of painter Jan Willem Pieneman.

Pieneman studied under his father and also at the Royal Academy of Fine Arts in Amsterdam; he was a pupil of Jean Baptiste Madou. He specialised in paintings of recent history and in portraits. He was a friend of William II of the Netherlands; he painted the king's inauguration in 1840, and many members of the royal family. His pupils were Jan Daniël Beijnon, Johannes Arnoldus Boland, Conradijn Cunaeus, Bernard te Gempt, Hendrik Hollander, Willem Johann Martens, Johan Heinrich Neuman, Jan Frederik Tack, and Antonie Frederik Zürcher.

In July 1855, Jan Hendrik Donkel Curtius (the Opperhoofd in Nagasaki, Japan) recorded the presentation of an oil portrait of King Willem III by Pieneman, together with the steamship Soembing.

Pieneman died on 30 December 1860 in Amsterdam in the Netherlands.

Honours and affiliations 
He was a member fourth class of the Royal Netherlands Academy of Arts and Sciences and by virtue of this, from 1852 of Natura Artis Magistra. He was a member of the Society Arti et Amicitiae.

He was a knight of the Order of the Netherlands Lion, a Commander of the Order of Adolphe of Nassau and appointed to the Order of the Polar Star.

Works

References

External links

Nicolaas Pieneman on Artnet

1809 births
1860 deaths
19th-century Dutch painters
Dutch male painters
Members of the Royal Netherlands Academy of Arts and Sciences
People from Amersfoort
19th-century Dutch male artists